Šmigovec is a village and municipality in Snina District in the Prešov Region of north-eastern Slovakia.

History
In historical records the village was first mentioned in 1569.

Geography
The municipality lies at an altitude of 326 metres and covers an area of 7.125 km2. According to the 2013 census it had a population of 90 inhabitants.

References

External links
 
http://www.statistics.sk/mosmis/eng/run.html

Villages and municipalities in Snina District